Fortner is a surname. Notable people with the surname include:

Ethel Fortner (1907–1987), American poet
Johann Fortner (1884–1947), German general
Mike Fortner, American politician
Nell Fortner (born 1959), American women's basketball coach
Ron Fortner (1941–2003), American talk radio host and television news anchor
Wolfgang Fortner (1907–1987), German classical composer and conductor

See also
 Fortner Mounds, Native American mounds in Fairfield County, Ohio, United States
 Anschütz 1827 Fortner, a rifle designed by Peter Fortner junior